Puncturella abyssicola is a species of minute deepwater keyhole limpet, a marine gastropod mollusks or micromollusk in the family Fissurellidae, the keyhole limpets and slit limpets.

Description

Distribution

References

Fissurellidae
Gastropods described in 1885